Oxysterol-binding protein-related protein 5 is a protein that in humans is encoded by the OSBPL5 gene.

This gene encodes a member of the oxysterol-binding protein (OSBP) family, a group of intracellular lipid receptors. Most members contain an N-terminal pleckstrin homology domain and a highly conserved C-terminal OSBP-like sterol-binding domain. Transcript variants encoding different isoforms have been identified.

References

Further reading